The Burlington Gymnasium, in Burlington, Colorado, was built during 1938–1941 as a New Deal works project.  It was listed on the National Register of Historic Places in 2007.

It is a two-story  building, with a balcony level over its open gymnasium space.  Its curtain walls and partition walls were built of concrete blocks made by the Works Progress Administration, except for some basement partition walls where adobe blocks were used.

There were problems during its construction including that the original installation of floor joists was deemed to be unsafe for longterm usage, which caused delay in completion.

References

National Register of Historic Places in Kit Carson County, Colorado
Art Deco architecture in Colorado
Buildings and structures completed in 1941